The 1989 Campeonato Profesional was the 42nd season of Colombia's top-flight football league. The season was cancelled after 318 matches because of the assassination of referee Álvaro Ortega on October 1 in Medellín. No champion was declared and no teams qualified for international competitions for the following season (however Atlético Nacional played the 1990 Copa Libertadores as champion of the previous edition).

League system
The season consisted in six phases. The first phase, Torneo Apertura, had a round-robin format. The second phase consisted in a Pentagonal (three groups of five teams each one, playing against each other at home and away). The third phase, Torneo Finalización, had a similar format that Torneo Apertura. The fourth phase, Cuadrangular Inicial, consisted in two groups of four teams each one, playing against each other at home and away. The others phases, Repechaje and the finals, were not played due to the cancellation of the tournament.

Teams received two points for a win and one point for a draw. If two or more teams were tied on points, places were determined by goal difference.

Teams

Torneo Apertura

Pentagonal

Torneo Finalización

Cuadrangular Inicial

Group A

Group B

Repechaje

Top goalscorers

Source: RSSSF.com Colombia 1989

References

Bibliography

External links
The 1989 on RSSSF

Categoría Primera A
Colombia
1